Fatma Mesanet Jeyan Mahfi Ayral Tözüm (born 6 August 1928) is a Turkish actress and voice actress.

Life and career 
Jeyan was born on August 6. 1928 in Istanbul. She started her artistic career with the encouragement of her father, Necdet Mahfi Ayral, when she was only three years old, by being played by Muhsin Ertuğrul in the play "Peer Gynt", a work of Henrik Ibsen. At Istanbul City Theatres; she acted in many plays such as "Happy Days", "Dressing the Nude", "Roots", "Half" and "Kezban" and retired from there.

She started dubbing at the age of 10 with the voice of the TV Show Happy Days. She has voiced many actresses such as Belgin Doruk, Türkan Şoray, Filiz Akın, Hülya Koçyiğit, Fatma Girik, Müjde Ar, Hale Soygazi, Emel Sayın, Gülşen Bubikoğlu, Ahu Tuğba and Hülya Avşar. She decided to leave the cinema with her husband in 1954 and devoted herself to theater plays and dubbing for many years. She also worked as a radio commercial speaker for 3 years. In addition to theater, she acted in movies and television series.

In 2005 she was awarded with Bilge Olgaç Achievement Award at the 8th Flying Broom International Women's Film Festival.

Personal life 
She was married to composer Rauf Tözüm who passed away in a traffic collision in 1978.

Filmography 

 1939: Allahın Cenneti
 1947: Gençlik Günahı
 1947: Seven Ne Yapmaz
 1949: Efsuncu Baba
 1949: Uçuruma Doğru
 1953: Beklenen Şarkı
 1954: Bozkurt Obası
 1972: Falcı
 1996: Gurbetçiler
 1996: Şehnaz Tango
 2000: Dadı
 2001: Tatlı Hayat
 2002: Ekmek Teknesi
 2004: Sahra
 2004: Yadigar
 2005: Belalı Baldız
 2006: Yaprak Dökümü
 2006: Hayırdır İnşallah
 2007: Hayat Apartmanı
 2010: Çığlık Çığlığa Bir Sevda
 2014: Deliha
 2018: Deliha 2

References 

1928 births
Living people
20th-century Turkish actresses
21st-century Turkish actresses
Turkish film actresses
Turkish television actresses
Turkish voice actresses
People from Istanbul
Turkish stage actresses